Pir Ghazi is a very small village in the Gujrat district of Pakistan,  north of the city of Gujrat.

Geography

Pir Ghazi is known for the shrine of Sayad Ghulam Mohiyuddin.

Education
A charity-run religious school for girls, with a capacity of 50, was founded by Mazhar Ahmad Sarsary, its headteacher and finance manager.

Populated places in Gujrat District